Desulfosporosinus is a genus of strictly anaerobic, sulfate-reducing bacteria, often found in soil.

The type species D. orientis was isolated in 1959 with the proposed name Desulfovibrio orientis, and was later assigned to the genus Desulfotomaculum. Based on 16S rRNA gene sequence data Desulfotomaculum orientis was reclassified as Desulfosporosinus orientis in 1997.

Species

Genomes 

Five complete Desulfosporosinus genomes are available, and another two genomes are in the progress of being sequenced.

Phylogeny
The currently accepted taxonomy is based on the List of Prokaryotic names with Standing in Nomenclature (LPSN) and National Center for Biotechnology Information (NCBI)

See also
 List of bacterial orders
 List of bacteria genera

References

External links

 Desulfosporosinus at LPSN
 Desulfosporosinus at NCBI
 Desulfosporosinus at GOLD
 Desulfosporosinus at NamesforLife

Peptococcaceae
Bacteria genera